Catagonium gracile is a species of moss from the genus Catagonium. It was described by Viktor Ferdinand Brotherus in 1908.

References

Hypnales